This is a complete list of Philippine Congressional committees (standing committees, and special committees) that are currently operating in the House of Representatives of the Philippines, the lower house of the Philippine Congress.


Standing committees 
Note: This is the list of standing committee chairmanships for the 19th Congress. It currently has 65 standing committees as of July 25, 2022.

 Special committees Note: This is the list of special committee chairmanships for the 19th Congress. It currently has 15 special committees as of July 25, 2022.

Changes in chairpersonships

See also
List of Philippine Senate committees
House of Representatives of the Philippines

References

External links
List of Committees in the Philippine House of Representatives

 
House of Representatives of the Philippines committees